The term boggan may refer to:

 Boggan, a species in the role-playing game Changeling: The Dreaming
 Jimmy Boggan (1938—2009), mentor for the Dublin hurling team
 Tim Boggan, table tennis player, USA Table Tennis Hall of Fame member, part of the Ping Pong Diplomacy exchange program
 Rex Boggan (1930—1985), American football player

See also
 Boggan-Hammond House and Alexander Little Wing, historic home located at Wadesboro, Anson County, North Carolina.
 Toboggan (disambiguation) 
 Bogan (disambiguation)